Jacutscia is a monotypic snout moth genus described by George Hampson in 1930. Its single species, Jacutscia strigata, described in the same article, is found in Siberia.

References

Phycitinae
Monotypic moth genera
Moths of Asia